"Brown Girl in the Ring" is a traditional children's song to the islands of the West Indies. Originally part of the children's game of the same name, thought to have originated in Jamaica, its lyrics instruct the game's performance: a girl enters the ring, formed by children holding hands, and performs a dance.

The song became internationally known when it was recorded by Euro-Caribbean vocal group Boney M. in 1978. Originally it was the B-side of their hit "Rivers of Babylon" but soon became a hit in its own right. The song had previously been recorded in 1975 by the group Malcolm's Locks, leading to a dispute over royalties. Bahamian musician Exuma also recorded a version of the song in 1972. The Boney M. version was remixed in 1993 by Frank Farian.

Origin
Children play ring games in many parts of the world, especially during their pre-teen years. In There's a Brown Girl in the Ring, an anthology of Eastern Caribbean song games by Alan Lomax, J.D. Elder and Bess Lomax Hawes, it is suggested that ring games are a children's precursor to adult courtship.

Boney M. recording (1978)
Arguably the most popular version of the song, Boney M.'s recording was originally the B-side to the group's number-one hit single "Rivers of Babylon" (1978). In July 1978, following ten weeks in UK Top Ten, five of them at number one, "Rivers of Babylon" slipped to number 18 and then to 20, when radio stations flipped the single. Airplay for "Brown Girl in the Ring" resulted in a happy chart reversal, with the single re-entering the Top Ten, where it would spend an additional nine weeks, peaking at number two in September. Liz Mitchell had previously recorded the song in 1975 with the group Malcolm's Locks, as the B-side of their single "Caribbean Rock". Mitchell's ex-boyfriend Malcolm Magaron was the group's lead singer. Arranger Peter Herbolzheimer accused Frank Farian of stealing his arrangement for the song, for which Farian claimed credit on the single. The court case ran for more than 20 years in Germany.

The early single version (1st pressing) released on the Diamond CD box-set in 2015 includes the full-length 4:18 version. The single mix is also slightly different from the album version: the latter makes use of steel drums on the outro riff of the song whereas the single mix does not. The four-minute single hit version (2nd pressing) has yet to appear on CD (as of July 2018). Rivers of Babylon/Brown Girl in the Ring single is the sixth best-selling single of all time in the UK with sales of 2 million.

1993 remix 
Following the successful sales of the compilation album Gold – 20 Super Hits, Frank Farian remixed "Brown Girl in the Ring" for a single release, April 1993, with new lead vocals by Liz Mitchell. The single reached number seven in Denmark and 38 in the UK, while failing to chart in Germany. The single also included a new remix of "The Calendar Song". A "rap version" with vocals from Marlon B was the B-side to most versions of the 1993 remix single.

Other versions 
Children's musician Raffi sings the song on his 1987 Everything Grows album.

Releases
12" single
 "Brown Girl in the Ring (Remix '93)" (MCI/BMG 74321 13705 1, 1993)
Side A
 "Brown Girl in the Ring" (Funny Girl Club Mix) – 5:45
 "The Calendar Song (January, February, March...)" (Remix '93) – 3:24
Side B
 "Brown Girl in the Ring" (Club Mix – Rap Version) – 5:45
 "Brown Girl in the Ring" (Radio Version) – 3:58

CD
 "Brown Girl in the Ring (Remix '93)" (MCI/BMG 74321 13705 2, 1993)
 "Brown Girl in the Ring" (Radio Version) – 3:58
 "Brown Girl in the Ring" (Funny Girl Club Mix) – 5:45
 "Brown Girl in the Ring" (Club Mix – Rap Version) – 5:45
 "The Calendar Song (January, February, March...)" (Remix '93) – 3:24

Recordings
 Lord Invader, a calypsonian from Trinidad, recorded a version circa 1946–1947 in New York. The recording is now part of the Smithsonian Folkways collection and was only released in 2000 on Lord Invader Calypso in New York CD.
 Lord Invader also recorded a new version of the song in the late 50's released on the There's a Brown Boy in the Ring and Other Children's Calypso Songs (1959).
 Jamaican poet, actress and singer Louise Bennett recorded the song in 1957 on an album of Children's Jamaican Songs and Games, re-released by Smithsonian Folkways (2007)
 Boney M.'s version was covered by several artists, including The Wiggles and Liquido.

In popular culture
 The song appeared in the film Touching the Void when mountaineer Joe Simpson worries he is succumbing to madness or death. He recalls: "I remember thinking, bloody hell, I'm going to die to Boney M".
 Nalo Hopkinson's first novel Brown Girl in the Ring took its name from the song.
 Liverpool FC fans have adopted the chorus as a crowd song to sing at games in support of Divock Origi.

Charts

1978 Boney M. version

1993 remix

See also 

 Hokey Pokey
 Musical chairs

References

Bibliography
 There's a Brown Girl in the Ring – Alan Lomax, J.D. Elder and Bess Lomax Hawes, Random House, New York, 1997 (Cloth)

1978 singles
1993 singles
European Hot 100 Singles number-one singles
Song recordings produced by Frank Farian
Songs written by Frank Farian
Boney M. songs
Hansa Records singles
Year of song unknown
Children's songs
Jamaican songs